Indira Dangi (born 13 February 1980) is a Hindi novelist, playwright and short story writer She has published one novel, one theatrical play and two books of short stories. Her works are widely acclaimed and acknowledged. She is a recipient of the Yuva Puraskar and Jnanpith Navlekhan Anushansa Award.

See also
 List of Indian writers

References

External links

1980 births
Living people
Indian women short story writers
Women writers from Madhya Pradesh
Hindi-language writers
Writers from Bhopal
Indian women dramatists and playwrights
21st-century Indian women writers
21st-century Indian writers
21st-century Indian novelists
Novelists from Madhya Pradesh
Dramatists and playwrights from Madhya Pradesh